Mount Kuipers is an ice-free mountain,  high, between Mount Benninghoff and Knobhead in the Quartermain Mountains of Victoria Land, Antarctica. It was named by the Advisory Committee on Antarctic Names in 1992 after Ronald L. Kuipers, formerly of the Central Intelligence Agency (CIA). From 1968–80 he was associated with committees within the U.S. Government responsible for coordinating Antarctic policy; he initiated and collaborated in the authorship of the atlas of Polar Regions, CIA, 1978.

See also
Gusty Gully

References

Mountains of Victoria Land
Scott Coast